Khani Gol Mohammad Rakhshani (also Romanized as Khānī Gol Moḩammad Rakhshānī) is a village in Dust Mohammad Rural District, in the Central District of Hirmand County, Sistan and Baluchestan Province, Iran. At the 2006 census, its population was 121, in 30 families.

References 

Populated places in Hirmand County